Wilhelm August Fleckhaus (21 December 1925 – 12 September 1983) was a German designer and art director, perhaps best known as art director of Twen magazine throughout its 1959 to 1970 existence. He was a prolific designer of book covers.

Fleckhaus was born in 1925 in Velbert, Germany.

He died of a heart attack at his home in Tuscany, Italy on 12 September 1983.

Exhibitions
2016: Willy Fleckhaus Design, Revolte, Regenbogen; Museum für Angewandte Kunst Köln (in Cooperation with Museum Villa Stuck, Munich).

2017: Willy Fleckhaus Design, Revolte, Regenbogen im Museum für Kunst und Gewerbe in Hamburg.

2017: Willy Fleckhaus Design, Revolte, Regenbogen; Museum Villa Stuck, Munich.

further venues in preparation

Bibliography
Fleckhaus - Design, Revolt, Rainbow. Ed. Michael Buhrs, Petra Hesse, text (german/english) by Hans-Michael Koetzle, Carsten Wolff. Hartmann Books, Stuttgart 2017, .

twen – Revision einer Legende. Ed. by Hans-Michael Koetzle (only german), Klinkhardt&Biermann, 1995, .

Michael Koetzle, Carsten M. Wolff (Ed.): Fleckhaus. Deutschlands erster Art Director, (only german). Klinkhardt & Biermann, 1997, .

References

1925 births
1983 deaths
Book designers
German art directors
German designers
German graphic designers